Smidtia is a genus of flies in the family Tachinidae.

Species
S. amoena (Meigen, 1824)
S. atriventris (Walker, 1852)
S. candida Chao & Liang, 2003
S. conspersa (Meigen, 1824)
S. fumiferanae (Tothill, 1912)
S. gemina (Mesnil, 1949)
S. japonica (Mesnil, 1957)
S. laeta (Mesnil, 1963)
S. laticauda (Mesnil, 1963)
S. longicauda Chao & Liang, 2003
S. winthemioides (Mesnil, 1949)
S. yichunensis Chao & Liang, 2003

References

Exoristinae
Diptera of Europe
Diptera of Asia
Diptera of North America
Tachinidae genera
Taxa named by Jean-Baptiste Robineau-Desvoidy